The 2015 Arkansas Razorbacks baseball team represented the University of Arkansas in baseball at the Division I level in the NCAA for the 2015 season. Dave van Horn was the coach and finished his thirteenth year at his alma mater.

Arkansas advanced to the 2015 College World Series for the eighth time in school history and fourth time under Van Horn.

Personnel

Schedule and results

References

Arkansas Razorbacks
Arkansas Razorbacks baseball seasons
Arkansas
College World Series seasons
2015 in sports in Arkansas